Gate Bridge may refer to:
The Golden Gate Bridge, a suspension bridge in San Francisco, United States
The Hell Gate Bridge, a steel through arch bridge in New York City, United States
The Lions' Gate Bridge, a suspension bridge in British Columbia, Canada
The McKay-Carter Intergalactic Gate Bridge in the Stargate fictional universe
The West Gate Bridge, a large cable-stayed box girder bridge in Melbourne, Victoria, Australia

See also
 Sather Gate and Bridge, landmark in Berkeley, California, USA
 Charlottenburg Bridge and Gate, in Berlin, Germany
 Toll bridge, a type of bridge typically having toll gates
 Drawbridge, a type of bridge stereotypically employed as a gate